Nesting is the delimitation of voting districts for one elected body in order to define the voting districts for another body. For example, in California, the State Assembly (the lower house) is composed of 80 members, each one representing 1/80 of California's population, and the State Senate (the upper house) is composed of 40 members, each one representing 1/40 of California's population. In this case, the process of nesting could either be first defining the 80 Assembly districts, and then defining the Senate districts as a merge of two Assembly districts, or first defining the 40 Senate districts, and then creating the Assembly districts by splitting each Senate district into two. If the Assembly districts and the Senate districts are created independently of each other, then the process of nesting is not used.

The major concerns of nesting are:
 the practice may impede the creation of majority-minority districts
 the practice may cause cities or other communities with common concerns to be split into different voting districts (and therefore dilute their votes)

US States which perform nesting
The US States which have nesting (with the ratio of lower house to upper)

 Alaska (2/1)
 Arizona (2/1) (districts are identical)
 Illinois (2/1)
 Iowa (2/1)
 Maryland (3/1) (29 of 47 districts are identical)
 Minnesota (2/1)
 Montana (2/1)
 New Jersey (2/1) (districts are identical)
 North Dakota (2/1) (45 of 47 districts are identical)
 Ohio (3/1)
 Oregon (2/1)
 South Dakota (2/1) (33 of 35 districts are identical)
 Washington (2/1) (districts are identical)
 Wisconsin (3/1)

In addition there are four states (California, Hawaii, New York, and Wyoming) that encourage, but do not require, nesting of voting districts.

Other jurisdictions which perform nesting

Under the 1970 constitution, Fiji had ten National constituencies. Each of them elected one indigenous Fijian member and one Indo-Fijian member on its own, but two national constituencies were nested into one for the election of General electors' representatives.

References

External links
The Implications of Nesting in California Redistricting an August 2007 UC Berkeley study by Bruce E. Cain and Karin Mac Donald (link to archive)

Redistricting in the United States
Constituencies
State legislative districts of the United States